This list is of the Historic Sites of Japan located within the Circuit of Hokkaidō.

National Historic Sites
As of 1 September 2019, fifty-five Sites have been designated as being of national significance (including one *Special Historic Site).

| align="center"|Cape Chashikotsu Upper SiteChashikotsu-misaki kami-iseki || Shari || || ||  || || 
|-
| align="center"|Samani Mountain TrailSamani sandō || Samani || || || || || 
|-
| align="center"|Saruru Mountain TrailSaruru sandō || Erimo || || || || || 
|-
|-
| align="center"|Former Utasutsu Satō Family Fisherykyū-Utasutsu Satō-ke gyoba || Suttsu || || ||  || || 
|-
|}

Prefectural Historic Sites
As of 1 May 2019, twenty-six Sites have been designated as being of prefectural importance.

Municipal Historic Sites
As of 1 May 2019, a further one hundred and eighty-one Sites have been designated as being of municipal importance.

See also
 Cultural Property (Japan)
 List of Places of Scenic Beauty of Japan (Hokkaido)
 List of Cultural Properties of Japan - paintings (Hokkaidō)
 List of Cultural Properties of Japan - historical materials (Hokkaidō)
 Hokkaido Museum

References

External links
  Cultural Properties of Hokkaidō
  List of National Cultural Properties of Hokkaidō
  List of Prefectural Cultural Properties of Hokkaidō
  List of Municipal Cultural Properties of Hokkaidō
 Comprehensive Database of Archaeological Site Reports in Japan (Nara National Research Institute for Cultural Properties)

Hokkaido
 Hokkaido